Bradfield's Namib day gecko (Rhoptropus bradfieldi) is a species of lizard in the family Gekkonidae. The species is endemic to Namibia. This species was first described in 1935 by the British-born, South African zoologist John Hewitt, who gave it the name Rhoptropus bradfieldi in honour of the South African naturalist and collector R.D. Bradfield (1882–1949).

Description
The dorsal surface is greyish-brown, indistinctly barred and dappled, and the ventral surface is bluish-grey. There are eleven scansors (specialist structures for adhesion) under the middle toe. This gecko is similar in appearance to the Namib day gecko (Rhoptropus afer), but that species is slightly smaller, has bright yellow underparts and only six scansors under the middle digit. The difference in scansor number between the two species, and the much shorter setae from which the scansors are formed in R. afer, are reflected in different lifestyles; R. bradfieldi, with more-adhesive feet, is a crevice-dweller with a slow, climbing lifestyle, while R. afer is much more terrestrial, running rapidly on the ground and jumping from rock to rock.

Distribution and habitat
Rhoptropus bradfieldi is endemic to Namibia. Its typical habitat is rocks and boulders in arid regions of the Namib Desert.

Ecology
Rhoptropus bradfieldi is a diurnal lizard and is an ambush predator of small arthropods such as ants, moths, and beetles. Its body is maintained at a high but steady temperature while it is active. It has a low field metabolic rate, about 26% of that of other desert lizards, but a relatively high water intake, which it probably fulfils from the fogs that often occur near the coast.

Reproduction
R. bradfieldi is oviparous.

References

Further reading
Barts, Mirko; Ballandat, Stefan (2009). "Rhoptropus bradfieldi Hewitt, 1935, Bradfield's Namib Day Gecko, Reproduction". African Herp News, Newsletter of the Herpetological Assosciation of Africa (47): 39–40.
Gates, Bruce C. (2008). "Day Geckos of the Namib Desert: Rhoptropus afer Peters, 1869 and Rhoptropus bradfieldi Hewitt, 1935". Gekko 5 (2): 2–5.
Hewitt, John (1935). "Some New Forms of Reptiles and Batrachians from South Africa". Records of the Albany Museum 4: 283–357. (Rhoptropus bradfieldi, new species, p. 307).
Rösler, Herbert (1995). Geckos der Welt: Alle Gattungen. Leipzig: Urania Verlag. 256 pp. . (Rhoptropus bradfieldi, p. 153). (in German).

Rhoptropus
Geckos of Africa
Reptiles of Namibia
Endemic fauna of Namibia
Reptiles described in 1935
Taxa named by John Hewitt (herpetologist)